Mitriță is a surname. Notable people with the surname include:

Alexandru Mitriță (born 1995), Romanian footballer
Dumitru Mitriță (born 1971), Romanian footballer

Romanian-language surnames